Heinz Bauer (31 January 1928 – 15 August 2002) was a German mathematician.

Bauer studied at the University of Erlangen-Nuremberg and received his PhD there in 1953 under the supervision of Otto Haupt and finished his habilitation in 1956, both for work with Otto Haupt. After a short time from 1961 to 1965 as professor at the University of Hamburg he stayed his whole career at the  University of Erlangen-Nuremberg.
His research focuses were potential theory, probability theory, and functional analysis.

Bauer received the Chauvenet Prize in 1980 and became a member of the  German Academy of Sciences Leopoldina in 1986. Bauer died in Erlangen.

References

 Konrad Jacobs, Obituary in Aequationes Mathematicae, Vol.65, 2003, p. 1

External links

 Obituary by Wulf-Dieter Geyer, pdf Datei (1,07 MB)
 Obituary in the Uni-Protokollen
 
 Bauer at the Mathematics Genealogy Project

Scientists from Nuremberg
20th-century German mathematicians
German Lutherans
University of Erlangen-Nuremberg alumni
Academic staff of the University of Erlangen-Nuremberg
1928 births
2002 deaths
Members of the Austrian Academy of Sciences
20th-century Lutherans